118 (one hundred [and] eighteen) is the natural number following 117 and preceding 119.

In mathematics
There is no answer to the equation φ(x) = 118, making 118 a nontotient.

Four expressions for 118 as the sum of three positive integers have the same product:
14 + 50 + 54 = 15 + 40 + 63 = 18 + 30 + 70 = 21 + 25 + 72 = 118 and
14 × 50 × 54 = 15 × 40 × 63 = 18 × 30 × 70 = 21 × 25 × 72 = 37800.
118 is the smallest number that can be expressed as four sums with the same product in this way.

118!! - 1 is a prime number, where !! denotes the double factorial (the product of even integers up to 118).

In other fields  
 There are 118 known elements, the 118th element being oganesson.

See also
 118 (disambiguation)

References

Integers